Bernina District is a former administrative district in the canton of Graubünden, Switzerland. It had an area of 237.2 km² and a population of 4,619 in 2015.  It was replaced with the Bernina Region on 1 January 2017 as part of a reorganization of the Canton.

It is the most south-easterly district in Switzerland, being surrounded on three sides by Italy and is predominantly Italian-speaking.  As of 2000, 91% of the population speak Italian, followed by German (7.2%) and Romansh (0.5%).

Bernina District consisted of two sub-districts, Brusio and Poschiavo, each of which contains a single municipality of the same name.

Languages

The official language of the district of Bernina is Italian.

References

Districts of Graubünden